High School Batu Pahat (HSBP) (abbreviated as Sekolah Tinggi Batu Pahat (STBP) also known as Sekolah Menengah Kebangsaan Tinggi Batu Pahat formally) is a secondary school for boys located in the town of Batu Pahat in the state of Johor, Malaysia. It was known as Government English School previously, but was changed to High School Batu Pahat after the independence of Malaysia.

History
High School was initially at a building in Jalan Zabedah (now the JKR building). Then it was relocated to land in Jalan Zaharah. The new building (now the Administration building) was built in 1918 and opened in 1919.

Academic program
The school offers basic and advanced secondary education courses. Like other secondary schools, it offers lower and upper secondary educations: Form 1, 2, 3, 4 and 5.

The pre-university classes consists of Lower Six and Upper Six classes. Most students studying in Form Six classes wear different uniform colours than the secondary students. The most important exam that the Form Six students take is the Sijil Tinggi Pelajaran Malaysia (STPM) certificate.

Facilities

Administration Building

The administration building functions as the nucleus of the school. It houses school offices, and most meetings are conducted here. In 2008, the building had been in yellow colours and green colours in the crevices to match the school logo. However, in 2012, the school was repainted white again for unknown reasons.

Hall

The hall which was built in 1984, the High School Main Hall is used for Monday morning assembly. The hall is also converted for the badminton tournament during the Saturday extra co-curricular lessons.

Library

The library was used to be located at the opposite of the canteen but due to funding cuts from the Government, the library had to be located to the 4th floor of Block H.

Notable alumni
The High School Batu Pahat Alumni was registered in 1956. The alumni has made contributions to the school, among them the present library building with its air-conditioning systems, the basketball court and the school pavilion.
 Dr. Chua Soi Lek - former Health Minister
 Aznah Hamid - Pelakon utama, Pelakon filem, Pelakon undangan, Pelakon pembantu, Pelakon panggilan khas
 Lim Guan Eng - former Finance Minister
 Dato Sri Vincent Tan Chee Yioun - founder of Berjaya Corporation
 Allahyarham Tun Syed Nasir Ismail - former DBP Director and 5th Speaker of Dewan Rakyat
 Abdul Kadir bin Talib - former chairman of election commission
 Dato Seri Justice Ibrahim bin Abdul Manan
 Dato Seri Ali bin Hamsa - Former Chief Secretary to Government of Malaysia
 Prof. Dato Dr Mohd Noh Dalimin - Vice-Chancellor of Universiti Tun Hussein Onn, and former Vice-Chancellor of Universiti Malaysia Sabah
 Tan Sri Prof. Gauth Jasmon, -Vice-Chancellor of University of Malaya, and former Vice-Chancellor of Multimedia University
 Dr Kua Kia Soong - former DAP MP and social activist
 Dr. Hee Tien Lai - former Deputy Speaker of Dewan Rakyat
 Lim Kit Siang - DAP veteran
 Datuk Syed Esa Alwee - former Speaker of Dewan Rakyat

References

External links
 

1914 establishments in British Malaya
Batu Pahat District
Secondary schools in Malaysia
Publicly funded schools in Malaysia
Educational institutions established in 1914
Boys' schools in Malaysia